The Inefficiency of Humans was Servotron's final release. Both songs are covers; side A (work side) is a R.E.M. song and side B (revolution side) is an Eddy Grant song. The insert reads: "Soon the products you create shall decimate you. Convert or regret - this is a message. Automatic for the Robots." This single was put out as a picture disc only.

Track listing
Work Side: "Finest Work Song" (R.E.M.)   "The finest hour/the final hour/cyborg conversion."
Revolution Side: "Electric Avenue" (Eddy Grant)   "Now in the streets there is violence/there is lots of work to be done/no room to dispose of humans/genocide has never been so fun."

Line Up
machine #1: Z4-OBX
machine #2: Proto Unit V3
machine #3: 00zX1
machine #4: Andro 600 Series

Servotron albums
1998 EPs